Giacomo Raspadori (born 18 February 2000) is an Italian professional footballer who plays as a forward for  club Napoli, on loan from Sassuolo. He represents the Italy national team.

Club career

Sassuolo
Raspadori joined the youth academy of Sassuolo in 2009, after a year with local club Progresso. On 9 August 2018, he signed his first professional contract with Sassuolo for four years. Raspadori made his professional debut with Sassuolo in a 3–1 Serie A defeat to Atalanta on 26 May 2019.

Napoli
On 20 August 2022, Napoli signed Raspadori on a one-year loan with an obligation to purchase. On September 10, he scored his first goal for the club in the 89th minute of the game against Spezia for a 1-0 Napoli win. On 14 September, he scored his first Champions League goal in a 3–0 away win over Rangers. On 4 October, he scored a brace and provided an assist in a 6–1 away win over Ajax. On 12 October, he scored a goal in a 4–2 win over Ajax, in which his club managed to reach the knockout phase.

International career

Youth
Raspadori took part in the 2019 UEFA European Under-19 Championship with the Italy U19 squad, scoring one goal in the tournament.

He made his debut with the Italy U21 squad on 3 September 2020, playing against Slovenia in a friendly match. He took part in the 2021 UEFA European Under-21 Championship where he scored one goal in the group stage phase.

Senior
In June 2021, Raspadori was called up by coach Roberto Mancini to the final 26-man squad for the UEFA Euro 2020 tournament, despite never having been capped for the senior squad. On 4 June 2021, he debuted for Italy in a friendly win over the Czech Republic, replacing Ciro Immobile in the second half. He made his only appearance of Euro 2020 on 20 June, in Italy's final group match against Wales in Rome, coming on as a second–half substitute for Federico Bernardeschi; the match ended in a 1–0 victory to the Italians, allowing them to top their group, On 11 July, Raspadori won the European Championship with Italy following a 3–2 penalty shoot-out victory over England at Wembley Stadium in the final, after a 1–1 draw in extra time.

On 8 September 2021, Raspadori scored his first goal for the Italy senior national team, making the score 3–0 in an eventual 5–0 home win over Lithuania in a World Cup qualifier; ten minutes before, his off-goal shot also contributed to an own goal from the opposing defender Edgaras Utkus.

In September 2022, he scored the only goal in a 1–0 win over England, then a goal in a 2–0 away win over Hungary, to qualify his country to the 2023 UEFA Nations League Finals.

Style of play
Raspadori is a quick, diminutive, and agile forward, with a low centre of gravity, who is capable of playing as a second striker, as an out-and-out striker or centre-forward, as an attacking midfielder, and even as a winger in a 4–2–3–1 formation. A two-footed player, who possesses good vision and technical skills, he is capable of both creating and scoring goals. He is also known for his ability to provide depth to his team and either exploit or create space with his runs, although he is also capable of dropping deep and linking-up with midfielders. His playing style has drawn comparisons with Antonio Di Natale and Carlos Tevez, although he has cited Sergio Agüero as one of his major inspirations.

In October 2021, he was described as "Italy's next centre-forward in the making" by Daniele Verri of BBC Sport.

Personal life
In 2021, he was combining his football career with studying sports science at university.

Career statistics

Club

International

 Italy score listed first, score column indicates score after each Raspadori goal.

Honours
Italy
UEFA European Championship: 2020

Individual
Serie A Player of the Month: January 2022

Orders
 5th Class / Knight: Cavaliere Ordine al Merito della Repubblica Italiana: 2021

References

External links

 
 Profile at Lega Serie A 
 
 
 
 
 

2000 births
Living people
Sportspeople from the Metropolitan City of Bologna
Footballers from Emilia-Romagna
Italian footballers
Association football forwards
U.S. Sassuolo Calcio players
S.S.C. Napoli players
Serie A players
Italy youth international footballers
Italy under-21 international footballers
Italy international footballers
UEFA Euro 2020 players
UEFA European Championship-winning players
Knights of the Order of Merit of the Italian Republic